KAPP (channel 35) is a television station in Yakima, Washington, United States, affiliated with ABC and owned by Morgan Murphy Media. The station's studios are located in the Liberty Building on North 3rd Street in downtown Yakima, and its transmitter is located on Ahtanum Ridge.

KVEW (channel 42) in Kennewick operates as a semi-satellite of KAPP, serving the Tri-Cities area; this station maintains its own studios on North Edison Street in Kennewick. As a KAPP semi-satellite, it simulcasts all network and syndicated programming as provided through its parent, and the two stations share a website. However, KVEW airs separate commercial inserts and legal identifications. Local newscasts are simulcast on both stations. KAPP serves the western half of the Yakima/Tri-Cities market while KVEW serves the eastern portion. The two stations are counted as a single unit for ratings purposes. Master control and some internal operations are based at the studios of sister station and fellow ABC affiliate KXLY-TV on West Boone Avenue in Spokane.

For reasons unexplained, only one of the two stations is carried on each satellite system, with KAPP on DirecTV, while Dish Network features KVEW. Like most markets, its subchannel signals are uncarried.

History

Before KAPP signed on, CBS affiliate KIMA-TV (channel 29) had carried ABC as a secondary affiliation until KNDO (channel 23) signed on in 1959. KNDO became the area's primary ABC affiliate until 1965, when it switched its primary affiliation to NBC. Both KNDO and KIMA-TV shared ABC's programming from that point until KAPP signed on the air on September 21, 1970 and all ABC programming moved to KAPP. The most notable ABC program shown on the station's first day was the first-ever Monday Night Football game between the Cleveland Browns and New York Jets.

The station began airing Spokane's MeTV affiliate KXMN-LD on a digital subchannel in September 2006. KAPP was one of the remaining stations to sign-off every night, but that practice ended in 2012 when World News Now was added to the programming lineup.

On December 22, 2008, KAPP discontinued its 6 p.m. and weekend newscasts. The 11 p.m. newscast was reduced to a five-minute broadcast before Nightline, and post-January 2013, Jimmy Kimmel Live! In addition to this move, 17 employees from KVEW and KAPP were laid off and KAPP's studio building was listed for sale.

While weather came from KXLY for several years, local weather reports have returned as of 2016, with meteorologist Jason Valentine at 5 and 6:30, and Kristen Walls during their Good Morning Northwest newscast. With the cancellation of The Insider and Extra moving from 6 p.m. to 7:30 on September 11, 2017, KAPP began airing local news at 6:00, for the first time in almost a decade.

Technical information

Subchannels
The station's digital signal is multiplexed:

KAPP has been digital-only since February 17, 2009.

Translator

References

External links
KAPP ABC 35

ABC network affiliates
Morgan Murphy Media stations
MeTV affiliates
Heroes & Icons affiliates
Start TV affiliates
Dabl affiliates
Television channels and stations established in 1970
1970 establishments in Washington (state)
APP